Michael Houghton may refer to:

Michael Houghton (virologist), co-discoverer of hepatitis C and Nobel laureate
Michael Houghton (bishop) (1949–1999), bishop of Ebbsfleet, 1998–1999
Mike Houghton, American football player